Côte-du-Sud is a provincial electoral district in the Bas-Saint-Laurent and Chaudière-Appalaches regions of Quebec, Canada, which elects members to the National Assembly of Quebec.  It includes the entire territory of the following regional county municipalities: Montmagny, L'Islet, Kamouraska. It notably includes the municipalities of Montmagny, La Pocatière, L'Islet, Saint-Pascal, Saint-Jean-Port-Joli, Cap-Saint-Ignace, Saint-Pamphile, Saint-Alexandre-de-Kamouraska, Saint-Pacôme and Berthier-sur-Mer.

It was created for the 2012 election from all of the former Montmagny-L'Islet and part of the former Kamouraska-Témiscouata electoral districts.

Members of the National Assembly

Election results

References

External links
Information
 Elections Quebec

Maps
 2011 map (PDF)
2001–2011 changes to Kamouraska-Témiscouata (Flash)
2001–2011 changes to Montmagny-L'Islet (Flash)
 Electoral map of Bas-Saint-Laurent region
 Electoral map of Chaudière-Appalaches region
 Quebec electoral map, 2011

2011 establishments in Quebec
La Pocatière
Montmagny, Quebec
Quebec provincial electoral districts